Mary Elizabeth Simpson (1865–1948) was a notable New Zealand religious teacher, healer and writer. She was born in Christchurch, North Canterbury, New Zealand in 1865.

References

1865 births
1948 deaths
New Zealand Christians
New Zealand Christian Scientists
People from Christchurch